Mestechko may refer to:
a place located within Pale of Settlement in the Russian Empire with predominantly Jewish population; see shtetl
the russifed form of the term "miasteczko"
a rural locality type in modern Russia
Mestečko, a town in Slovakia